Raul Veloso del Mar (March 20, 1941 – November 16, 2020) was a Filipino politician who served as the Representative of Cebu City's 1st district three times: from 1987 to 1998, from 2001 to 2010, and from 2013 until his death in 2020.

He was a graduate of the University of San Carlos and the Ateneo Law School.

Del Mar died on November 16, 2020 at the age of 79. The cause of his death has yet to be revealed by his family.

References

|-

|-

20th-century Filipino lawyers
People from Cebu City
1941 births
2020 deaths
Lakas–CMD (1991) politicians
Liberal Party (Philippines) politicians
Members of the House of Representatives of the Philippines from Cebu City
Bando Osmeña – Pundok Kauswagan politicians
University of San Carlos alumni
Ateneo de Manila University alumni
Deputy Speakers of the House of Representatives of the Philippines
Recipients of the Presidential Medal of Merit (Philippines)